Zak Best (born 11 October 2001) is an Australian racing car driver. He currently competes in the Dunlop Super2 Series in the No. 78 Ford FG X Falcon, with wins, podiums and poles to his name in the Super2 Series. He also raced in the 2021 Bathurst 1000, finishing in fifteenth.

Career

Early career
Best made his debut in the V8 Touring Car Series (now known as the Super3 Series) in 2018, finishing second in the opening round at Phillip Island behind defending champion Jack Smith and ahead of MW Motorsport teammate Tyler Everingham. Best would finish the season in second place behind Everingham.

Despite hopes to join the Super2 Series in 2019, Best continued in the Super3 series. Despite winning several races Best was only fourth in the championship, which team owner Matthew White blamed on engine issues at the Winton round.

Super2
For 2020, Best moved up to the Super2 Series, still driving for MW Motorsport. He qualified in third place on debut at the Adelaide Parklands Circuit, and achieved a best finish of fifth place in the final round at Bathurst.

Best switched to Tickford Racing for 2021, finishing the championship in second place behind Broc Feeney. He remained with Tickford for the 2022 series. He finished runner up again in his 2022 campaign.

Best announced for his 2023 Super2 campaign that he would be making the switch to Anderson Motorsport driving an ex-Dick Johnson Racing Ford Mustang GT. He is expected to stay on at Tickford Racing for the endurance events.

Supercars
Best made his Supercars Championship and Bathurst 1000 debut in 2021 driving with his Super2 team Tickford Racing. He partnered regular driver Jack Le Brocq in his Ford Mustang GT for the 2021 Bathurst 1000. He was given a late call-up due to Alexandre Prémat being unable to make the trip to Australia. The pair qualified in eighth place were only able to finish in fifteenth place, in part due to double stacking in the pits. Best was described by team principal Tim Edwards as being one of the best co-drivers in that year's race.

For 2022 Tickford announced that they would enter Best in Supercars rounds at Hidden Valley and The Bend as a wildcard. In Sunday qualifying, Best crashed, forcing him to start from the back on the grid in the final two races. In the second of these, Best was involved in a collision with Gary Jacobson, causing Best to retire, with Best highly critical of the driving standards of the drivers towards the rear of the field.

On July 30 2022, Best became the youngest and first Supercars Championship wildcard entrant to claim a pole position, which was done at the 2022 The Bend SuperSprint. Best finished race 21 5th, becoming the highest finishing placed wildcard entrant.

Career results

Aussie Racing Cars 2016 at age 14, Best was the youngest ever to compete and win a race (Phillip Island) and runner up Rookie, in an Aussie Racing Car.
CAMS Jayco Australian Formula 4 Championship 2017 finished 10th. Khumo V8 Supercars 2018, drove Ford FG with MW Motorsport finished Runner Up. Khumo Tyres Super3 2019, drove Ford FG with MW Motorsport finished 4th

Super2 Series results
(key) (Race results only)

Supercars Championship results
(key) (Races in bold indicate pole position) (Races in italics indicate fastest lap)

Complete Bathurst 1000 results

References

Australian racing drivers
Living people
People from Benalla
Supercars Championship drivers
2001 births
Racing drivers from Victoria (Australia)